Pelashyria is a genus of parasitic flies in the family Tachinidae.

Species
Pelashyria grisescens Villeneuve, 1935

Distribution
Congo.

References

Diptera of Africa
Exoristinae
Monotypic Brachycera genera
Tachinidae genera
Taxa named by Joseph Villeneuve de Janti